The 1908 Villanova Wildcats football team represented Villanova University as an independent during the 1908 college football season. Led by fifth-year head coach Fred Crolius, Villanova compiled a record of 1–6. The team's captain was Joseph Walsh.

Schedule

References

Villanova
Villanova Wildcats football seasons
Villanova Wildcats football